Maccabi Holon is an Israeli women's football club from Holon competing in the Israeli First League and the Israeli Women's Cup. Maccabi dominated Israeli women's football through much of the 2000s, winning six championships and seven cups between 2003 and 2010, including five doubles in a row. It has represented Israel in the UEFA Women's Cup in seven occasions. In recent years it has been surpassed by ASA Tel Aviv.

History
The club was established in 1999 under the name Maccabi Ironi Holon and joined the league in its second season, finishing 11th. In 2002, after the collapse of Maccabi Tel Aviv and Hapoel Tel Aviv, the club signed several of their top players, allowing it to challenge for titles, eventually winning both league and cup. The club signed more top players after the collapse of Maccabi Haifa a year later, and went on to win all league titles and cups until 2009, after which the club remained at the top of Israeli women's football, and managed to win two cups, in 2009–10 and 2012–13, while finishing as runners-up three times in the league.

Honours
Israeli 1st League (6)
2002–03, 2004–05, 2005–06, 2006–07, 2007–08, 2008–09
Israeli Cup (9)
2002–03, 2003–04, 2004–05, 2005–06, 2006–07, 2007–08, 2008–09, 2009–10, 2012–13

UEFA competitions record

References

External links
Maccabi Holon Israeli Football Association 

Women's football clubs in Israel
Association football clubs established in 1999
Sport in Holon
1999 establishments in Israel